Deja Monét Trimble (born April 8, 1991), better known by her stage name Dej Loaf (stylized as DeJ Loaf), is an American rapper, singer and songwriter from Detroit, Michigan. She began her music career in 2011, and released her debut single "Just Do It" in 2012. In October 2014, she released her second mixtape, Sell Sole.

Early life
Deja Trimble was raised on the East side of Detroit, Michigan. As a child, she often listened to music with her parents and grandmother, including 2Pac, Rakim and Miles Davis. Her father was killed when she was four years old. A self-described "good kid and a decent student" who mostly kept to herself, she began writing her own original music at the age of 9. In 2009, she graduated from Southeastern High School in Detroit, playing basketball at the junior varsity level. She then attended Saginaw Valley State University and studied nursing for three semesters before deciding to focus full-time on her music career.

Music career
In 2011, Dej Loaf began her career as a hip hop artist. Her stage name is a portmanteau of a shortened version of her first name, "Deja", and "loafer", as she took a keen interest in Air Jordans when growing up. In 2013, she released her first official mixtape, Just Do It.. That mixtape attracted the attention of a fellow Detroit-native rapper SAYITAINTTONE. She was later signed to his indie record label, called IBGM (I Been Gettin' Money) under his management team. In July 2014, she released her track, called "Try Me" (produced by DDS), as a single, which earned her viral popularity.  Canadian hip hop recording artist Drake quoted lyrics from the song in his Instagram post. In October 2014, she signed a major record deal to Columbia Records. After signing the deal, she released her second official mixtape, called Sell Sole. The mixtape was given an "A−" by music critic Robert Christgau, who wrote in his review for Vice, "What's irresistible is the form-content disparity—a rapper who brags so un-macho, a rapper whose greed is so explicitly for her family, a rapper who's 'Grindin' ' at music. Plus her flow is a brook, her producer respects her space, and her two sex rhymes are into it and into it more."

Dej Loaf rapped on the song "Detroit vs. Everybody" featured on a fellow American high-profile rapper Eminem's compilation Shady XV (2014). In 2015, she opened for Nicki Minaj during the North American leg of The Pinkprint Tour. Later that year, she was chosen as part of the XXL magazine 2015 Freshman Class.

In February 2016, Dej Loaf released a mixtape called All Jokes Aside. In July 2017, she released a joint mixtape with Jacquees titled Fuck a Friend Zone.

After several years of delays, Dej Loaf split from Columbia Records in 2019. She then independently released her debut album, Sell Sole II on October 23, 2020. It features appearances from Big Sean, Gunna, Rick Ross, Lil Uzi Vert, and 6LACK. The album is the sequel to Dej Loaf's 2014 mixtape Sell Sole. The album holds a 72/100 rating on Metacritic, indicating "generally favorable reviews."

In February 2021, Dej Loaf was featured on Sevyn Streeter's single "Guilty" along with Chris Brown and A$AP Ferg.

Discography

Studio albums

Extended plays

Mixtapes 
 Just Do It (2012)
 Sell Sole (2014)
 All Jokes Aside (2016)
 Fuck a Friend Zone  (2017)

Singles

As lead artist

As featured artist

Guest appearances

Notes

References

External links 
 
 

1991 births
Living people
21st-century American singers
American women rappers
African-American women rappers
American hip hop singers
Columbia Records artists
Midwest hip hop musicians
Rappers from Detroit
Saginaw Valley State University alumni
21st-century American rappers
21st-century American women singers
21st-century African-American women singers
21st-century women rappers